Burt William Johnson (April 25, 1890 – March 27, 1927) was an American sculptor.

Biography
Johnson was born in Flint, Ohio. At the age of 13, he went to live for a year in Cornish, New Hampshire, where his older sister Annetta Johnson Saint-Gaudens, wife of sculptor Louis Saint-Gaudens, was studying with Louis' brother, master sculptor Augustus Saint-Gaudens. Johnson moved to Claremont, California in 1907 to study at Pomona College, and then to New York City in 1909 to study at the Art Students League of New York.
He worked with fellow sculptors James Earle Fraser, Robert I. Aitken and George Bridgman, as well as his brother-in-law, Louis St. Gaudens. Back in California after Louis St. Gaudens' death in 1913, he moved into the studio that his brother-in-law had created during a visit to Claremont.

Johnson remained active in both California and New York, and is well known for his statues honoring American soldiers of World War I, known as doughboys. Examples of these doughboy statues can be found in DeWitt Clinton Park and 
Doughboy Park in New York City, the latter being named the best war memorial of its kind by the American Federation of Artists in 1928. 
Garfield Park in Pomona, California has another World War I tribute created by Johnson, dedicated in 1923, with an allegorical representation of Pomona, the Goddess of Fruit, beside a young man. The Children's Tribute to the World War Heroes (1919) in Robert Keller Park in Huntington Park, California, depicts a barefoot girl holding the uniform caps of a sailor and a doughboy to her heart.

Among his earlier works is The Spirit of Spanish Music, a fountain with the
bronze figure of a boy playing a flute, located in Lebus Court of the Mabel Shaw Bridges Hall of Music at Pomona College.  His allegorical figures of Architecture and Sculpture  decorate the exterior of the 1927 Fine Arts Building (Los Angeles), with additional reliefs near the top of the building's façade. The inside lobby has a fountain with sculptures of children, modeled by his daughter, Cynthia (age 3) and his son Harvey (age 5). That son, Harvey W. Johnson (1921–2005), was a prominent Western artist and became president of the Cowboy Artists of America.
In addition, Johnson's grandsons Casey Schwarz and Scott Lee Johnson continue the family involvement in sculpture.
There is also a granddaughter, Darcy Lynn a painter, and a great granddaughter, Tamsin Parker, a painter and animator.

In 1918, Johnson was a leading candidate to execute a memorial to 
community leader and publisher of the Los Angeles Times, Gen. Harrison Gray Otis,.
who had died the year before.
The Los Angeles Evening Herald called him a "100 per cent American sculptor", and
pictured him "putting the finishing touches" on his model
for the memorial in a story announcing that the project would be delayed until after
the conclusion of the World War, since the amount of bronze needed to complete the work 
"would be sufficient to construct two cannon".
The project ultimately was awarded to Russian sculptor Prince Paul Troubetzkoy

For his final project, the façade and lobby sculptures of the
Los Angeles Fine Arts Building, Johnson's
sister, Annetta Johnson Saint-Gaudens, and her son Paul St Gaudens, both sculptors
themselves, provided assistance, as did Santa Monica, California sculptor Merrell Gage.
In his final years, feeling he wanted to work on something creative and not concentrate
just on sculpture, Johnson wrote a novel about an artist's life in Greenwich Village, New York City.
Burt Johnson died in Claremont, California, on March 27, 1927, at the age of 36. He is buried next to his wife Ottilie M. Johnson (1891–1980) in Oak Park Cemetery, Claremont, California, US.

Selected works (locations known)
 The Spirit of Spanish Music (1916) 
 Albert John Cook memorial tablet (1917) 
 Greek Theater commemorative tablet (dedicated 1917) 
 Children's Tribute to the World War Heroes (1919) 
 Elisha Newton Dimick Memorial (1921) 
 World War Memorial Panel 
 Portrait bust (c.1921) of Dr Henry Kingman (1864–1921), early pastor 
 Theodore Edwin Norton Memorial Fountain and Tablet (1922) 
 Anna I. Young Memorial Panel (1923) 
 Pomona World War I Memorial (Goddess of Fruit) (1923) 
 Doughboy Monument (1923) 
 The Returned Soldier (1923) 
 Lobby and façade sculptures (1926) 
 Flanders Field Doughboy (1927, dedicated 1930)

Selected works (current locations unknown)
 The Little Director (1916) 
 Hope Braithwaite Smith memorial tablet (1917) 
 Christ Panel (April 1917) 
 Piping Faun, sculpture in front of the organ screen, right side of the proscenium, in Grauman's "Million Dollar" Theatre (1918) Los Angeles, California, US
 The Answering Note 
 Little Sculptor Boy, at one time in Lobby of the Fine Arts Building, Los Angeles, California (c.1927)

Gallery

External links

 Claremont Colleges Digital Archive, 31 historic images
 Burt W. Johnson, 1890-1927 (Folder), Smithsonian Institution, CollectionsSearchCenter

References

American male sculptors
Sculptors from Ohio
20th-century American sculptors
People from Franklin County, Ohio
Pomona College alumni
Art Students League of New York alumni
1890 births
1927 deaths
Sculptors from New York (state)
20th-century American male artists